Fresh Mode is the first release by Long Beach hip hop group Ugly Duckling. It was released by 1500 Records.

Track listing 

"Fresh Mode" - 3:47
"Now Who's Laughin'" - 2:59
"Get On This" - 3:59
"Einstein's Takin' Off" - 3:19
"Everybody C'mon" - 3:20
"Do You Know What I'm Sayin'" - 2:40
"Everything's All Right" - 3:44
"We're Here" - 3:38

References

Ugly Duckling (hip hop group) albums
1999 EPs